Umberto Pelizzari (born August 28, 1965) is an Italian freediver, widely considered among the best of all time. Of his era, he is the sole person to have established world records in all the then existing disciplines of freediving.

Early life 

Pelizzari was born in the Lombardian city Busto Arsizio. He debuted as a child in professional swimming, moving to freediving at age 19.

Sportive achievements 

All through the 1990s Pelizzari became famous for his sportive rivalry with the time's other world top freediver, Cuban Francisco "Pipin" Ferreras, originally a close training friend around 1990.

The rivalry of Pelizzari and Ferreras became the focus of the 2001 IMAX production Ocean Men: Extreme Dive, directed by renowned under water photographer Bob Talbot.

Pelizzari was one of a handful of instigators behind the respected freediving organization AIDA which formed in 1994. Twice, in 1996 and 2001, Pelizzari became AIDA World Champion with the Italian national team.

Post-athletic life 

Pelizzari is currently professor at the Scuola Superiore Sant'Anna di Pisa and a TV host. He has also formed the freediving training agency Apnea Academy which sees much respect in freediving circuits, and co-authored the widely used Manual of Freediving with his former trainer Stefano Tovaglieri.

References

External links
 Umberto Pelizzari official website
 Umberto's Official Facebook Page
 Apnea Academy - School for Instruction and Research of Freediving - founded by Umberto Pelizzari 
 Pelizzari's BOOKS

1965 births
Living people
People from Busto Arsizio
Italian freedivers
Italian male swimmers
Italian television personalities
Sportspeople from the Province of Varese